Pat Fleming (born June 30, 1978) is a former Canadian Football League punter and placekicker who played for five seasons for the Ottawa Renegades, Hamilton Tiger-Cats and Winnipeg Blue Bombers. He played college football for the Bowling Green Falcons.

References

External links
Canadian Football League

1978 births
Bowling Green Falcons football players
Canadian football punters
Hamilton Tiger-Cats players
Living people
Ottawa Renegades players
Players of Canadian football from Ontario
Canadian football people from Ottawa
Winnipeg Blue Bombers players